John Radford may refer to:

 John B. Radford (1813–1872), American physician, businessman and namesake of Radford, Virginia
 John Radford (footballer) (born 1947), former English football player
 John Radford (broadcaster), Canadian broadcaster
 John Radford (politician) (1930–2001), Australian politician
 John Radford (wine writer) (1946–2012), British writer and broadcaster on wine and food
 John Radford (businessman) (born 1965), English football club chairman
 John Radford (Rector of Lincoln College, Oxford) (1851–?), Oxford college head

See also
 John Worboys (born 1957), British criminal, also known as John Radford